Formula 2000 (F2000) may refer to:

F2000 Championship Series
U.S. F2000 National Championship
Formula 2000 (Japan), a Japanese open-wheel racing category from 1973 to 1977
Pacific F2000, a U.S. open-wheel racing category
MRF Formula 2000, an Indian open-wheel racing category
F2000 Italian Formula Trophy an Italian open-wheel racing series

See also
 Formula 5000 
 Formula 4000 
 Formula 3000 (tier above F2000)
 Formula 1000
 Formula Three (replacement for F2000)
 Formula Two (replacement for F3000)